William H. "Adonis" Terry (August 7, 1864 – February 24, 1915) was an American Major League Baseball player whose career spanned from his debut with the Brooklyn Atlantics in , to the Chicago Colts in . In his 14 seasons, he compiled a 197-196 win–loss record, winning 20 or more games in a season four different times.

Career

Brooklyn
The following season, the team was admitted into the American Association as the Brooklyn Atlantics, and he stayed with the team. In that  season, the team finished in ninth place, and his win–loss record reflected that. Although his record was 19-35, he led the team with an earned run average of 3.55, and struck out 230 hitters.

Over the next three seasons, Terry had average-to-good seasons, had a combined record of 40 wins and 49 losses, even throwing a no-hitter against the St. Louis Browns on July 24, 1886. But it was not until  that he turned into a star pitcher. In that season, he had a 13-8 record, a 2.03 ERA, and tossed his second no-hitter, this time against the Louisville Colonels on May 27, 1888.

In , the team won the American Association championship with Terry winning 22 games. He pitched five games, winning two, in the "World Series" after the season with the New York Giants, a series that Brooklyn lost six games to three. The  season turned out to be a disappointment for both Brooklyn and Terry, as the team finished in sixth place and Terry record fell to 6-16 and a 4.22 ERA.

Pittsburgh
On June 10, 1892, Brooklyn released Terry, and was quickly signed by the Baltimore Orioles on June 14. He played just one game for Baltimore, a complete games loss, and was then traded to the Pittsburgh Pirates on June 17 in exchange for Cub Stricker.

Chicago
In , he changed teams for the last time. After pitching in one game for the Pirates, he was then picked up by the Chicago Colts and had moderate success in his four seasons with them.

On July 13, 1896, he had the unfortunate distinction of giving up all four home runs to Philadelphia Phillie hall-of-Famer Ed Delahanty in a game played at the old West Side Grounds. Pitching the complete game, he and his Colts were able to prevail, winning the game 9-8.

His career totals include a 197 wins and 196 losses, a 3.74 ERA, and 1,553 strikeouts in 3,514.1 innings pitched. He was also a versatile player, often playing other positions, including 216 games in the outfield, with games also played at shortstop, first base and third base.

Post-career

Umpiring
After his Major League career was over, he became an umpire for 39 games in the  National League season. He had filled the umpire position from time to time during his playing days. In total, he umpired 51 games, 48 of them as the home plate umpire, as the custom was that there was only one umpire used in each game.

Death
Adonis is the honoree of old-time baseball events that are held in his hometown of Westfield, such as the group Westfield Wheelmen Vintage Base Ball Club. Terry died in Milwaukee, Wisconsin at the age of 50 from an episode of pneumonia, and was cremated.

See also
 List of Major League Baseball no-hitters

References

External links

Baseball players from Massachusetts
Major League Baseball pitchers
Major League Baseball outfielders
Brooklyn Grays (Interstate Association) players
Brooklyn Atlantics (AA) players
Brooklyn Grays players
Brooklyn Bridegrooms players
Brooklyn Grooms players
Baltimore Orioles (NL) players
Pittsburgh Pirates players
Chicago Colts players
Milwaukee Brewers (minor league) players
Milwaukee Creams players
19th-century baseball players
1864 births
1915 deaths